Virginie Razzano and Iva Majoli were the defending champions but only Razzano competed that year with Émilie Loit.

Loit and Razzano lost in the first round to Jelena Dokić and Magdalena Maleeva.

Nathalie Dechy and Meilen Tu won the final on a walkover when Janette Husárová and Elena Dementieva were forced to withdraw when Dementieva developed bronchitis.

Seeds
Champion seeds are indicated in bold text while text in italics indicates the round in which those seeds were eliminated.

 Daniela Hantuchová /  Elena Likhovtseva (quarterfinals)
 Květa Hrdličková /  Henrieta Nagyová (withdrew, right wrist injury Nagyová)
 Barbara Schett /  Magüi Serna (first round)
 Jelena Dokić /  Magdalena Maleeva (semifinals)

Draw

References

External links
2002 Open Gaz de France Doubles Draw

Doubles
Open Gaz de France